Dehnar (also Romanized as Dehnār) is a village in Abarshiveh Rural District, in the Central District of Damavand County, Tehran Province, Iran. At the 2006 census, its population was 1500.

References 

Populated places in Damavand County